Emma Allene Roberts (September 1, 1928 – May 9, 2019) was an American actress.

Early years
Born in Fairfield, Alabama, Roberts was the daughter of Mr. and Mrs. Frank W. Roberts. In 1941, she won the "America's Most Charming Child" contest sponsored by the New York Daily Mirror, receiving $1,000 in cash and a $1,000 contract with Warner Bros. studio.

Career
Roberts appeared in twelve movies between 1947 and 1954 and on TV in Four Star Playhouse, Adventures of Superman and Dragnet. Her first big picture was The Red House (1947) starring Rory Calhoun, Julie London and Edward G. Robinson. That movie was considered by the critics to be the "sleeper hit" of the year.

Roberts' other films included the film noir pair, Knock on Any Door, Union Station and Bomba on Panther Island.

Death 
On May 9, 2019, Roberts died in Huntsville, Alabama, at age 90.

Filmography

References

External links

Allene Roberts at the American Film Institute
Allene Roberts: True to her roots

1928 births
2019 deaths
20th-century American actresses
Actresses from Birmingham, Alabama
American child actresses
American film actresses
American television actresses
People from Fairfield, Alabama
21st-century American women